Nazodelavo Cave Natural Monument is a karst cave  6.8 km to the north from village Akhuti  in Chkhorotsqu Municipality in Samegrelo-Zemo Svaneti region of Georgia. Cave is located on the left bank of river Zana (Khobi river tributary), 290 meters above sea level. Nazodelavo means the dwelling of Zodelavos. According to cave narratives, it was used as a means of defense in the middle ages.

Morphology 
Nazodelavo karst cave formed in a conglomerates of the Neogene geologic period in Odishi plain karst massif. Cave is 600 m long with main tunnel  average width of 4 m and height 3 m. The two main outlets are narrower and shorter than the main cave tunnel. A cold underground river with clear water flows through an erosion canyon in cave floor. In some places depth of the erosion canyon reaches 7-8 meters.

Fauna 
In the cave and in the surrounding area on the surface there are summer moths.  
The inhabitants of the cave include Lepidocyrtus, Folsomia  and Oxychilus.

See also 
Prometheus Cave Natural Monument

References

Natural monuments of Georgia (country)
Caves of Georgia (country)
Protected areas established in 2013
Geography of Imereti